Thoranam is a 1987 Indian Malayalam film, directed by Joseph Madappally and produced by V. Rajan. The film stars Nedumudi Venu, Yamuna, Janardanan and Kunjandi in the lead roles. The film has musical score by G. Devarajan.

Cast
Nedumudi Venu - Gopi
Yamuna
Janardanan
Kunjandi
M. G. Soman
Oduvil Unnikrishnan
Vanchiyoor Radha

Soundtrack
The music was composed by G. Devarajan and the lyrics were written by O. N. V. Kurup.

References

External links
 

1987 films
1980s Malayalam-language films